Mumtaz Husain, better known as Mumtaz Mufti (September 11, 1905 – October 27, 1995), was a writer from Pakistan.

Initially a religious skeptic influenced by authors like Freud, Havelock Ellis, Alfred Adler and Fyodor Dostoevsky, he would eventually come back to Islam through Sufism.

Critic Nasir Abbas Nayyar described his writing style as psychological realist.

Early life
Mumtaz Mufti was born Mumtaz Husain in Batala, Punjab (now in India). He was the son of Muhammad Hussain and his first wife Sughra Khanum. He was employed as a civil servant under British rule, having earlier started his career as a school teacher. Soon after partition in 1947, he migrated to Pakistan with his family.

As a writer
Mumtaz Mufti started writing Urdu short stories while working as a school teacher before 1947. In the beginning of his literary career, he was considered, by other literary critics, a non-conformist writer having liberal views, who appeared influenced by the psychologist Freud. Pakistan's famous writer Ashfaq Ahmed was one of his close friends. According to Ashfaq Ahmed, Mufti used to read unpopular literature by a Swedish writer before 1947. Mufti initially did not like the 1947 partition plan of British India, but changed his views later to become a patriotic Pakistani. In his later life, he used to defend Islam and its principles. His transformation from Liberalism to Sufism was due to his inspiration from a fellow writer Qudrat Ullah Shahab. Despite all the changes in his viewpoints, he did manage to retain his individual point of view and wrote on subjects which were frowned upon by the conservative elements in the society.

The two phases of his life are witnessed by his autobiographies, Ali Pur Ka Aeeli (1961) and Alakh Nagri. According to forewords mentioned in his later autobiography, Ali Pur Ka Aeeli is an account of a lover who challenged the social taboos of his times, and Alakh Nagri is an account of a devotee who is greatly influenced by the mysticism of Qudrat Ullah Shahab.

The book Talaash ("Quest") was the last book written by Mumtaz Mufti. It reportedly highlights the true spirit of Quranic teachings.

Awards and recognition
 1986: Sitara-e-Imtiaz (Star of Excellence) Award by the President of Pakistan
 1989: Munshi Premchand Award (a literary award from India)

Legacy

His son, Uxi Mufti, a literary critic himself, created a Mumtaz Mufti Trust after his death in October 1995. This trust has been observing Mumtaz Mufti's death anniversary events in different cities of Pakistan. His friends and admirers, including Ashfaq Ahmed, Bano Qudsia and Ahmad Bashir have appeared as speakers at these events. Another famous writer Kishwar Naheed comments in one of her book reviews that Mumtaz Mufti had plenty of human weaknesses but also has appreciated him as a learned critic. There is a road named after him in the city of Multan, Pakistan.

Books

Short stories
 Gehma Gehmi, 1949, 256 p.
 Asmarain, 1952, 327 p.
 Ghubare, 1954, 220 p.
 Ghurya ghar, 1965, 312 p.
 Raughani putle, 1984, 244 p.
 Muftiyane, 1989, 1526 p. (collected short stories)
 Kahi na jae, 1992, 178 p.
 Chup, 1993, 269 p.
 Samai ka bandhan, 1993, 192 p.
 Talash, 1996, 278 p. (last book, the theme being Islam)

Play
 Nizam saqqah, 1953, 169 p.

Autobiographical novels
 Alipur ka Eli, 1961, 1188 p. (first part of the autobiography)
 Alakh nagri, 1992, 996 p. (second part of the autobiography)

Travelogues
 Hind Yatra, 1982, 359 p. (travel to India)
 Labbaik, 1993, 320 p. (account of a Hajj pilgrimage undertaken in 1968)

Essays
 Piyaz ke chilke, 1968, 184 p. (literary criticism and views on Pakistani nationalism) 
 Aukhe log, 1986, 311 p. (impressions of famous Pakistani writers)
 Aukhe avalre, 1995, 258 p. (biographical sketches of famed Pakistani authors)

References

1905 births
1995 deaths
Pakistani autobiographers
Pakistani novelists
Pakistani male short story writers
Urdu-language short story writers
Pakistani dramatists and playwrights
Scholars of Sufism
Urdu-language novelists
Pakistani literary critics
Writers from Lahore
Punjabi people
20th-century novelists
Recipients of Sitara-i-Imtiaz
20th-century Pakistani short story writers
20th-century Pakistani male writers
Converts to Islam from atheism or agnosticism